Zanclea is a genus of hydrozoans belonging to the family Zancleidae.

The genus has cosmopolitan distribution.

Species
Species:

Zanclea alba 
Zanclea apicata 
Zanclea apophysis 
Zanclea baudini 
Zanclea bomala 
Zanclea carinata 
Zanclea cladophora 
Zanclea costata 
Zanclea cubensis 
Zanclea cylindrica 
Zanclea divergens 
Zanclea dubia 
Zanclea eilatensis 
Zanclea exposita 
Zanclea fanella 
Zanclea gallii 
Zanclea gemmosa 
Zanclea giancarloi 
Zanclea gilii 
Zanclea hicksoni 
Zanclea hirohitoi 
Zanclea implexa 
Zanclea indica 
Zanclea indopacifica 
Zanclea macrocystae 
Zanclea margarita 
Zanclea medusopolypata 
Zanclea migottoi 
Zanclea ngeriana 
Zanclea nitida 
Zanclea parasitica 
Zanclea polymorpha 
Zanclea prolifera 
Zanclea protecta 
Zanclea retractilis 
Zanclea sagittaria 
Zanclea sango 
Zanclea sardii 
Zanclea sessilis 
Zanclea spiralis 
Zanclea tipis

References

Zancleidae
Hydrozoan genera